The Battle of Huanta was a battle that took place between rebel and Spanish forces during the Cuzco Rebellion of 1814.

References
Notes

Bibliography
 
 

Battles of the Peruvian War of Independence
Conflicts in 1814
History of Ayacucho Region